Wei Sijia (born 3 December 2003) is a Chinese tennis player.

Wei has a career high WTA singles ranking of 416 achieved on 9 January 2023. She also has a career high WTA doubles ranking of 378 achieved on 26 December 2022.

Professional career

2022: First ITF Tournament Wins
After not playing on the ITF World Tennis Tour in 2021, Wei began 2022 competing in qualifying draws at the W15 level.  With steadily improving results she won her first W15 final at the end of June. This led to a total of 16 titles (6 singles and 10 doubles), and her WTA ranking climbed from 1054 (at the end of 2020) to 434 at the end of 2022.   All 16 titles were won in Monastir.  
In 2022, her first full year on the ITF women's tour, Wei won more matches than any other player with 64 main draw wins.  Her total of 10 doubles titles was also equal to the most for any player.  

Wei won her first ITF title above the W15 level at the 2022 Open Feu Aziz Zouhir in the doubles draw partnering Priska Madelyn Nugroho.  It was the fourth title win for the two partners.

ITF Circuit finals

Singles: 7 (6 titles, 1 runner–up)

Doubles: 11 (10 titles, 1 runner-up)

References

External links

2003 births
Living people
Chinese female tennis players
21st-century Chinese women